Yaliwal  is a village in the southern state of Karnataka, India. It is located in the Kundgol taluk of Dharwad district in Karnataka.

Demographics
As of the 2011 Census of India there were 1,021 households in Yaliwal and a total population of 5,212 consisting of 2,723 males and 2,489 females. There were 548 children ages 0-6.

See also
 Haveri
 Districts of Karnataka

References

External links
 http://Dharwad.nic.in/

Villages in Dharwad district